Namala or  Namala Guimba  is a small town and commune in the Cercle of Kita in the Kayes Region of south-western Mali. The commune contains 10 villages and in the 2009 census had a population of 15,667.

References

External links
.

Communes of Kayes Region